The Imperial Gazetteer of England and Wales is a substantial topographical dictionary first published between 1870 and 1872, edited by the Reverend John Marius Wilson. It contains a detailed description of England and Wales. Its six volumes have a brief article on each county, city, borough, civil parish, and diocese, describing their political and physical features and naming the principal people of each place.

The publishers were A. Fullarton and Co., of London & Edinburgh. The work is a companion to Wilson's Imperial Gazetteer of Scotland, published in parts between 1854 and 1857.

The text of the Imperial Gazetteer is available online in two forms, as images you pay for on the Ancestry web site, and as freely accessible searchable text on A Vision of Britain through Time, which also accesses Groome's Ordnance Gazetteer of Scotland and the Bartholomew Gazetteer of the British Isles. Volumes 1–4 and 6 (i.e. all but volume 5) are available at the Internet Archive. However, it should be treated with some caution. The scale of the project was such that Wilson was unable to check all statements himself, and for many smaller places the information given is out of date or even wrong.

See also
Gazetteer

References

External links
 Volumes available online at Internet Archive:
 Vol I: Aaron End – Chartley Holme
 Vol II: Chart – Grasmere
 Vol III: Grasmoor – Lees
 Vol IV: Leescourt – Mounton
 Vol VI: Sheffield – Zouch

Reference works in the public domain
Books about England
1870 books
1871 books
1872 books
Gazetteers